The Wheeler–Schebler Carburetor Company was one of the Indianapolis's most important auto parts manufacturers and the last automobile parts factories in Indianapolis, Indiana to survive from the first decades of the 20th century. The  Wheeler–Schebler Carburetor Company Building was the company's original building at the Barth Avenue site. It was added to the National Register of Historic Places in 2004.

History 
In 1904, Harry C. Stutz, who was involved in the design and manufacture of internal combustion engines, introduced George Schebler to Frank W. Wheeler. In the resulting partnership, Wheeler provided the money, while Schebler provided the engineering skills. Stutz worked temporarily as Sales Manager. By 1907, they had achieved enough success to move to Indianapolis into a state-of-the-art factory, reportedly one of the most advanced in the United States at the time. It produced carburetors for over 15 makes of autos from 1911 up to 1951.

Frank Wheeler and three other local men opened the Indianapolis Motor Speedway in 1909. Prior to the inauguration of the Indianapolis 500 in 1911, the Wheeler-Schebler company sponsored the Wheeler-Schebler Trophy Race at the track. George Schebler sold his interests in the company in 1912, but it continued to operate under the Wheeler-Schebler name until 1928, when it evolved into the Marvel-Schebler Carburetor Company, one of five companies that played a role in the development of what became Borg-Warner Corporation.

The Marvel-Schebler company did some of the early work on fuel injection systems in the late 1950s and early 60s, eventually merging with the Tillotson Carburetor Company in 1971. In 1985, the name was revised to "Control Systems" by the parent company, Borg-Warner. When Borg-Warner went through a leveraged buyout in 1987, Borg Warner Automotive Inc. was spun off as an independent company that is still in operation, developing fuel efficient engine and drive train technology. To this day, the trophy awarded annually to the winner of the Indianapolis 500 is known as the Borg-Warner Trophy.

The original Wheeler-Schebler building still survives. It used to house the "Wheeler Arts Community" and the "Community Arts and Education Center" in the Fountain Square district of Indianapolis at 1035 East Sanders Street until it was closed in 2018. The building is now being converted into market-rate housing units.

References

External links 
 Wheeler–Schebler Carburetor Company Building at National Park Service

BorgWarner
National Register of Historic Places in Indianapolis
Industrial buildings and structures on the National Register of Historic Places in Indiana
Industrial buildings completed in 1902
Carburetor manufacturers
Arts centers in Indiana
American artist groups and collectives
University of Indianapolis
Motor vehicle manufacturing plants on the National Register of Historic Places
Transportation buildings and structures on the National Register of Historic Places in Indiana
Transportation buildings and structures in Marion County, Indiana
Fountain Square, Indianapolis
Defunct automotive companies of the United States
Defunct manufacturing companies based in Indiana